John Ralph Oberst (August 11, 1918 – June 1, 2009) was an American professional basketball player. He played for the Cleveland Allmen Transfers in the National Basketball League for nine games during the 1945–46 season and averaged 1.1 points per game.

References

1918 births
2009 deaths
American men's basketball players
United States Navy personnel of World War II
Baldwin Wallace Yellow Jackets men's basketball players
Basketball players from Cleveland
Cleveland Allmen Transfers players
Forwards (basketball)